Original meaning of the word Monopoly comes from Greek as a compound of two words “mono,” which means “single” or “one,” and “polein“, meaning “ to sell.“ This word was perceived as an exclusive legal right of sale covered by Government usually ensured by patent or licence. In the seventeenth century was monopoly defined by sir Edward Coke as “allowance by the King to any person or corporate for the sole buying, selling, making, working or using anything, whereby any person or corporate are sought to be restrained of any freedom or liberty that they had before.” In the eighteenth century was developed another definition by Samuel Johnson as “exclusive privilege of selling anything.” In the course of time has monopoly become interpreted as a private accumulation of economic power or an entity that has total or near-total control of a market.

England 
For the first time, monopolies have become socially significant in the early seventeenth century in England under the reign of Queen Elizabeth I. and King James I. who were selling monopolistic licences as a benefit for their own enrichment. The result was a significant increase of prices in particular industries accompanied by enforcing rest of suppliers not to produce, often affected by strict punishments for patent infringement. Long disputation about the efficiency of royal grants of monopoly privileges have been led and finally with the contribution, among others, of Darcy v. Allen and sir Edward Coke royal rights on providing licences have been strictly restraint. Undesirable effects of diminishing social wealth were discussed and new theory of monopolies have begun to be created.

Colonial America 
Although most parts of the British law was commonly used as identical in colonies, monopolistic part was not clearly defined in America therefore new specific versions of both patents for economic development and restrictions on the issuance of patents have been enacted. As an example could state Massachusetts’s body of Liberty from 1641 which declared no monopolies are acceptable except for new inventions that are profitable to the country. While leaderships of American colonies began to issue amendments to the law in form of charters and relations with Britain continued to deteriorate, constantly emitted monopolies on England’s suppliers became direct cause of American’s indignation. When England enacted set of laws enabling domestic merchants of many branches to sell with monopoly in British colonies, plenty black markets have arisen accompanied with protests. Well-known is the protest in Boston called Boston Tea Party reacting on raising of taxes, the main target was indeed British government and East India company owning a monopoly over tea import. Continuous efforts to discredit Americans to compete in foreign markets and to secure benefits associated with it have led to the American revolution and the consequent rise of the United states.

Post-industrial monopoly 
Process of creating powerful private monopolistic corporates fulfilling a definition of modern monopoly according to its economic position and market power are mostly connected with second half of nineteenth and twentieth century in United States. Public concerns about the state-granted monopolies shifted to fear of private ones. Several of the emerging economic giants such as Standard Oil or Carnegie Steel Company had become so influential on the market that American government had to create new section of antitrust laws to prevent from diminishing social wealth. Most important laws of that time are the Sherman Antitrust Act in 1890 and the Clayton Antitrust Act in 1914. Many constitution have been modified to meet current monopoly requirements, for example Minnesota Constitution stated in 1888: “Any combination of persons, either as individuals or members or officers of any corporation to monopolize the markets for food products in this state, or to interfere with, or to restrict the freedom of such markets, is hereby declared to be a criminal conspiracy and shall be punished in such manner as the Legislature shall provide.” Within this period have been both monopolies and government antitrust laws modified and spread into the whole world even more with trend of globalization. Corporates are consistently observed currently to comply with antitrust measures because the extended modern economic theory proved that an uncontrolled monopoly diminish public wealth.

See also
Monopolistic competition
 Monopolies big ideas
 Demonopolization
 Duopoly
 Monopsony
 Bilateral monopoly
 Oligopoly
 Sherman Antitrust Act

References

Monopoly (economics)